The men's team pursuit competition in speed skating at the 2022 Winter Olympics was held on 13 February (semifinals) and 15 February (final), at the National Speed Skating Oval ("Ice Ribbon") in Beijing. Hallgeir Engebråten, Peder Kongshaug and Sverre Lunde Pedersen, representing Norway, won the event. Norway defended their 2018 title, but Pedersen was the only athlete returning to the podium. Daniil Aldoshkin, Sergey Trofimov and Ruslan Zakharov, representing the Russian Olympic committee, won the silver medal, the first time a Russian team medaled in the event. Zakharov, formerly a short track speed skater and the 2014 Olympic champion in the team relay, became the second man, after Eric Flaim, to medal at the Olympics in both speed skating and short track speed skating. Ethan Cepuran, Casey Dawson, Emery Lehman and Joey Mantia of the United States won bronze.

Norway were the defending champion and the Olympic record holder at the beginning of the Olympics. South Korea and the Netherlands are the 2018 silver and bronze medalist, respectively. The Netherlands are the 2021 World Single Distances champion in team pursuit, with Canada second and the Russian Skating Union third. The United States were leading the 2021–22 ISU Speed Skating World Cup after three events before the Olympics, ahead of Norway and Canada. At one of the world cup events, two months before the start of the Olympics, the US team set a new world record. The four previous editions of this event at the Olympics were won by four different teams.

Qualification

A total of 8 team quotas were available for the event, with a maximum of one team per NOC. The top six countries qualified through their performance at the 2021–22 ISU Speed Skating World Cup, while the last two countries qualified through their time performance.

Emergence of a new technique
In January 2020 the US team debuted a new team pursuit technique. While historically skaters share the work by rotating the front athlete to the back, they transferred energy from one athlete to the other by pushing and not rotating. The technique has since become known as the American Push.

In February 2021 the Canadian team won a World Cup using this new technique. In an ISU press release the second place Dutch team conceded that the strategy was superior to their approach.

In the last World Cup before the Olympic Games the US team set a world record on home ice using the new technique.

All three medal winning teams at the 2022 Beijing Olympics used the American Push technique.

The significance of the American Push has been compared to the Fosbury Flop and the Clap Skate.

Records
Prior to this competition, the existing world, Olympic and track records were as follows.

A new Olympic record was set during the competition.

Results

Quarterfinals
The quarterfinals were held on 13 February at 21:00.

Semifinals
The semifinals were held on 15 February at 14:52.

Finals
The finals were held on 15 February at 15:43.

References

Men's speed skating at the 2022 Winter Olympics